Ellis Jones (5 April 1900–1972) was an English footballer who played in the Football League for Hull City and Oldham Athletic.

References

1900 births
1972 deaths
English footballers
Association football forwards
English Football League players
Stanley United F.C. players
Willington A.F.C. players
Crook Town A.F.C. players
Spennymoor United F.C. players
Hull City A.F.C. players
Annfield Plain F.C. players
Oldham Athletic A.F.C. players
Workington A.F.C. players
Blackhall Colliery Welfare F.C. players